James Ward (born 7 June 1974) is a New Zealand cricketer. He played in two first-class matches for Canterbury from 2000 to 2005.

See also
 List of Canterbury representative cricketers

References

External links
 

1974 births
Living people
New Zealand cricketers
Canterbury cricketers
Cricketers from Christchurch